Esat Bicurri was a Kosovar singer of popular music of Albanian origin. He was executed by Serbian forces during the Kosovo War in 1999. His corpse was found and reburied in 2004.

The Ministry of Culture of Kosovo charted the creation of a National Prize named after Esat Bicurri for excellence in music and popular urban music.

References

External links
A collection of Esat Bicurri's songs in mp3 and wma
Esat Bicurri - E kujtoj atë takim (video)

20th-century births
1999 deaths
Kosovan singers
Kosovan murder victims
People murdered in Kosovo
Kosovo Albanians
Yugoslav male singers
Year of birth missing
1999 murders in Serbia
1999 crimes in Kosovo
1990s murders in Kosovo